Stefano Taverna (died 1499) was a Roman Catholic prelate who served as Bishop of Parma (1497–1499).

Biography
On 20 Dec 1497, Stefano Taverna was appointed during the papacy of Pope Alexander VI as Bishop of Parma.
He served as Bishop of Parma until his death in Jan 1499.

References

External links and additional sources
 (for Chronology of Bishops) 
 (for Chronology of Bishops) 

15th-century Italian Roman Catholic bishops
Bishops appointed by Pope Alexander VI
1499 deaths